Miletus leos is a butterfly in the family Lycaenidae. It is found in Asia.

Subspecies
 M. l. leos (southern Moluccas: Serang, Ambon, Buru)
 M. l. aronicus (Fruhstorfer, 1914) (Aru, Misool, Waigeu, New Guinea)
 M. l. catoleucos (Fruhstorfer, 1913) (Salayer)
 M. l. florensis (Fruhstorfer, 1913) (Flores, Pura, Adonara, Alor, possibly Sumbawa)
 M. l. mangolicus (Fruhstorfer, 1913) (Sula Islands)
 M. l. maximus (Holland, 1890) (Celebes, Bouton, Sangir, Talaut, Buton, Muna, Banggai)
 M. l. tellus (Fruhstorfer, 1913) (Wetar, Timor)
 M. l. teos (Doherty, 1891) (Sumba, possibly Sumbawa)
 M. l. virtus (Fruhstorfer, 1913) (northern Moluccas: Bachan, Ternate, Halmahera)

References

Butterflies described in 1830
Miletus (butterfly)